Rita Ávila  is a Filipino actress and author.

Ávila is married to director, Erick Reyes, she had a baby who they named Elia Jesú E. Reyes. The baby died three weeks after being born. She also wrote an inspirational booklet called, 8 Ways to Comfort with Grace, centering on her sad moments when she and her husband lost their three-week-old son; Si Erik Tutpik at si Ana Taba, a book for children who experienced bullying; and The Invisible Wings, a fable that lets us see our world, our time as a likely place for angels. She later received a letter from Monsignor Peter B. Wells, an official of the Vatican Secretariat of State, expressing the Pope's gratitude for the books titled The Invisible Wings and 8 Ways to Comfort with Grace. The Invisible Wings 2 has been released together with her first novel, Wanna Bet on Love.

She is a critically acclaimed film actress whose movies such as Stella Magtanggol (1992) and Tatlo, Magkasalo (1998) and The Flor Contemplacion Story (1995) have been looked over as historically recognizable in Philippine Cinema. In the late 1990s she ventured more into drama soaps and anthology’s as a supporting character or main protagonist or antagonist. She started her television career on GMA Network as part of That's Entertainment before transferring to ABS-CBN during 1995 though appeared in Anna Karenina. Avila returned to GMA-7 in 2001 and stayed there for nine years before going freelance.

Filmography

Film

Television

References

External links

Living people
Year of birth missing (living people)
Actresses from Manila
Filipino film actresses
Filipino people of German descent
Filipino television actresses
That's Entertainment (Philippine TV series)
That's Entertainment Tuesday Group Members
GMA Network personalities
ABS-CBN personalities